The 2014–15 Star Hotshots season was the 27th season of the franchise in the Philippine Basketball Association (PBA).

Key dates
August 24: The 2014 PBA draft took place in Midtown Atrium, Robinson Place Manila.
October 15: Team officials announced that the team will be renamed as the Purefoods Star Hotshots starting this season's Philippine Cup.
October 22: The Grand Slam championship ring ceremony of the team was held before the start of their game against the Alaska Aces.
November 9: (Manila Clasico) The team retired the jersey numbers of Rey Evangelista (#7) and Jerry Codiñera (#44) before their game against Barangay Ginebra San Miguel. They also wore a modified version of their 1989 jerseys.
December 11:The Hotshots lost to the Meralco Bolts in the first phase of the quarterfinals having a twice-to-beat disadvantage, they hardly-fought in a cold-game but they struggled until the end game, losing the game with the score off 77–65. The loss ends the four-straight championship run of the Hotshots since the 2013 PBA Governors' Cup and it's also the first time that the Hotshots did not qualify to the semis since the 2013 PBA Commissioner's Cup.
May 9:The franchise change their name to Star Hotshots.

Draft picks

Roster

Philippine Cup

Eliminations

Standings

Game log

Playoffs

Bracket

Commissioner's Cup

Eliminations

Standings

Game log

Playoffs

Bracket

Governors' Cup

Eliminations

Standings

Bracket

Game log

Transactions

Overview

Trades

Draft day

Philippine Cup

Recruited imports

References

Magnolia Hotshots seasons
Star